The 1882 U.S. National Championships (now known as the US Open) took place on the outdoor grass courts at the Newport Casino in Newport, United States. The tournament ran from 30 August until 2 September. It was the 2nd staging of the U.S. National Championships, and the second Grand Slam tennis event of the year. Thirty players entered the singles competition and fifteen teams took part in the doubles championship.

Finals

Singles

 Richard Sears defeated  Clarence M. Clark  6–1, 6–4, 6–0

Doubles

 Richard Sears /  James Dwight def.  Crawford Nightingale /  George Smith 6–2, 6–4, 6–4

References

External links
Official US Open website

 
U.S. National Championships
U.S. National Championships (tennis) by year
U.S. National Championships (tennis)
U.S. National Championships (tennis)
U.S. National Championships (tennis)
U.S. National Championships (tennis)